John L. Brooke (born 1953) is an American historian.

Life
Brooke graduated from Cornell University in 1975, and from the University of Pennsylvania, with an M.A. and Ph.D. in 1982. 
He taught at Franklin & Marshall College, Amherst College, and Tufts University.
He most recently teaches at Ohio State University.

Awards
 1991 Merle Curti Award for Intellectual History from the Organization of American Historians
 National Historical Society Book Prize
 1995 Bancroft Prize
 1997 Guggenheim Fellow
 National Endowment for the Humanities fellowship

Works
   (2nd edition 2005)

References

External links
 

1953 births
21st-century American historians
21st-century American male writers
Amherst College faculty
Cornell University alumni
Historians of the Latter Day Saint movement
Ohio State University faculty
Tufts University faculty
University of Pennsylvania alumni
Living people
Bancroft Prize winners
American male non-fiction writers